Saturn Award for Best DVD or Blu-ray Special Edition Release (formerly known as Saturn Award for Best DVD Special Edition Release) is an award given by the Academy of Science Fiction, Fantasy and Horror Films to every alternative edition of a film. The following is a list of the winners of this award:

References

Best Special Edition DVD Release